Trent John Baalke (born February 14, 1964), is an American football executive who is the general manager of the Jacksonville Jaguars of the National Football League (NFL).

Early years
A Rosendale, Wisconsin native, Baalke earned his bachelor's degree in health and physical education at Bemidji State University, where he played outside linebacker and was an All-Northern Sun Conference and All-Midwest Region honoree.

Executive career

Early career
Baalke's worked as a scout for the New York Jets from 1998 to 2000. In 2001, Baalke was hired by the Washington Redskins and spent four years with the team, first as a national scout and then as college scouting coordinator.

San Francisco 49ers
In 2005, Baalke was hired by the San Francisco 49ers as their western region scout and in 2008, was promoted to director of player personnel, a position largely responsible for overseeing the team's college scouting operations. Baalke was chosen to lead the 49ers in the 2010 NFL Draft, in place of Scot McCloughan, and a month later was given the title of vice president of player personnel. His official promotion to general manager came shortly after the firing of Mike Singletary as head coach of the 49ers, in anticipation of needing an official general manager to lure Jim Harbaugh away from Stanford for the vacant coaching position.

In January 2012, Baalke was named PFWA Executive of the Year for the 2011 season, after being credited for transforming a 6–10 team into a 13–3 team in his first season as general manager. The next month he received a contract extension through 2016.

After a 2014 season filled with reports that Baalke and then-49ers coach Jim Harbaugh had been clashing, the 49ers parted ways with Harbaugh and promoted defensive line coach Jim Tomsula to the head coaching position. Tomsula led the 49ers to a 5–11 record in 2015 and was fired on January 3, 2016. On January 14, 2016, Chip Kelly was hired as the head coach of the 49ers and led them to a 2–14 record, one of the worst conference records in their franchise history and their worst season since 2004. This led to Baalke and Kelly both being relieved of duties on January 1, 2017.

NFL
In 2017, Baalke became a football operations consultant for the NFL. In this advisory role for NFL, he worked on game-related matters, player development, evaluation, and officiating video review.

Jacksonville Jaguars
On February 4, 2020, he was hired as director of player personnel of the Jacksonville Jaguars. On November 29, 2020, Baalke was promoted to interim general manager following the firing of David Caldwell, and was retained for the role fulltime after the season.

References

External links
Jacksonville Jaguars bio

Living people
American football linebackers
Bemidji State Beavers football players
Jacksonville Jaguars executives
New York Jets personnel
North Dakota State Bison football coaches
San Francisco 49ers executives
South Dakota State Jackrabbits football coaches
Washington Redskins personnel
National Football League general managers
1964 births
People from Rosendale, Wisconsin